This list is complete and up-to-date as of December 31, 2014.
The following is a list of players, both past and current, who appeared at least in one game for the Cincinnati Reds National League franchise (1890–1953, 1958–present), also known previously as the Cincinnati Red Stockings (1882–1889) and Cincinnati Redlegs (1953–1958).
Players in Bold are members of the National Baseball Hall of Fame.

Players in Italics have had their numbers retired by the team.


A

Andy Abad
Ted Abernathy
Cal Abrams
George Abrams
Joe Abreu
José Acevedo
Tom Acker
Bobby Adams
Karl Adams
Sparky Adams
William Adams
Joe Adcock
Jon Adkins
Troy Afenir
Jeremy Affeldt
Santo Alcalá
Chuck Aleno
Bob Allen
Ethan Allen
Nick Allen
Carlos Almanzar
Rafael Almeida
Yonder Alonso
Dave Altizer
Rogelio Álvarez
Red Ames
Vicente Amor
Harry Anderson
Jimmy Anderson
Mike Anderson
Wingo Anderson
Nate Andrews
Eric Anthony
Pete Appleton
Jimmy Archer
Ed Armbrister
Jack Armstrong
Morrie Arnovich
José Arredondo
Gerry Arrigo
Bronson Arroyo
Luis Arroyo
Casper Asbjornson
Ken Ash
Barrett Astin
Justin Atchley
Rick Auerbach
Rich Aurilia
Jeff Austin
Chick Autry
Steve Avery
Jay Avrea
Dylan Axelrod
Bobby Ayala
Manuel Aybar
Joe Azcue

B

Fred Baczewski
Jim Bagby, Sr.
Bob Bailey
Ed Bailey
Homer Bailey
Jim Bailey
King Bailey
Doug Bair
Bill Baker
Ernie Baker
Paul Bako
Bobby Balcena
Jack Baldschun
Frank Baldwin
Kid Baldwin
John Bale
Mike Balenti
Wladimir Balentien
Dick Baney
Scott Bankhead
Kevin Barker
Junie Barnes
Skeeter Barnes
Germán Barranca
Jimmy Barrett
Red Barrett
Shad Barry
Kimera Bartee
Bob Barton
Billy Bates
Johnny Bates
Matt Batts
Jim Baumer
Frank Baumholtz
Harry Bay
Dick Bayless
Johnny Beall
Ollie Beard
Jim Beauchamp
Roger Bernadina
Boom-Boom Beck
Clyde Beck
Erve Beck
Fred Beck
Beals Becker
Jake Beckley
Jim Beckman
Fred Beebe
Jodie Beeler
Joe Beggs
Jim Begley
Mel Behney
Tim Belcher
Stan Belinda
Bo Belinsky
Matt Belisle
Tim Belk
Buddy Bell
Gus Bell
Mike Bell
Rob Bell
Trevor Bell
Mark Bellhorn
Freddie Benavides
Johnny Bench
Ray Benge
Larry Benton
Rube Benton
Todd Benzinger
Jason Bere
Bruce Berenyi
Bill Bergen
Wally Berger
Marty Berghammer
William Bergolla
Frank Berkelbach
Gerónimo Berroa
Damon Berryhill
Bob Bescher
Harry Betts
Hal Bevan
Dante Bichette
Dan Bickham
Harry Biemiller
Larry Biittner
Dann Bilardello
Steve Bilko
Jack Billingham
Tim Birtsas
Joe Black
Earl Blackburn
Jim Blackburn
Lena Blackburne
Ewell Blackwell
Paul Blair
Ed Blake
Linc Blakely
Fred Blank
Cliff Blankenship
Don Blasingame
Steve Blateric
Ned Bligh
Jimmy Bloodworth
Willie Bloomquist
Jack Blott
Otto Bluege
Jim Bluejacket
Len Boehmer
Sam Bohne
Jim Bolger
Tom Bolton
Ricky Bones
Jung Bong
Nino Bongiovanni
Bill Bonham
Chris Booker
Aaron Boone
Bret Boone
Pedro Borbón
Frenchy Bordagaray
Bob Borkowski
Steve Boros
Mel Bosser
Jim Bottomley
Jason Bourgeois
Joe Bowman
Matt Bowman
Ray Boyd
Jack Boyle
Buddy Bradford
Scott Bradley
Neal Brady
Darren Bragg
Glenn Braggs
Dave Brain
Jeff Branson
Jeff Brantley
Russell Branyan
Ángel Bravo
Bill Bray
Danny Breeden
Ted Breitenstein
Don Brennan
Lynn Brenton
Rube Bressler
Charlie Brewster
Marshall Bridges
Rocky Bridges
Al Bridwell
Harry Bright
Gus Brittain
Jim Brosnan
Joe Brovia
Jim Brower
Curly Brown
Jumbo Brown
Keith Brown
Marty Brown
Mordecai Brown
Scott Brown
Stub Brown
Pete Browning
Tom Browning
Jonathan Broxton
Jay Bruce
Frank Bruggy
Jacob Brumfield
Bob Buchanan
Mark Budzinski
Jim Bunning
Dave Burba
Smoky Burgess
Eddie Burke
Ken Burkhart
Bill Burns
George Burns
Joe Burns
Mike Burns
Sheldon Burnside
George Burpo
Jared Burton
Guy Bush
Jack Bushelman
Chris Bushing
Sal Butera
Bud Byerly
Sammy Byrd

C

 Jolbert Cabrera
 Orlando Cabrera
 Greg Cadaret
 Miguel Cairo
 Mike Caldwell
 Marty Callaghan
 Ray Callahan
 Mike Cameron
 Archie Campbell
 Billy Campbell
 Gilly Campbell
 Jim Canavan
 Jorge Cantú
 Tom Cantwell
 Doug Capilla
 Bernie Carbo
 Leo Cárdenas
 Don Carman
 Chet Carmichael
 Hick Carpenter
 Charlie Carr
 Giovanni Carrara
 Héctor Carrasco
 Clay Carroll
 Ownie Carroll
 Tom Carroll
 Arnold Carter
 Howie Carter
 Bob Caruthers
 Joe Cascarella
 Charlie Case
 Sean Casey
 Wilkin Castillo
 Nick Castellanos
 Roy Castleton
 Juan Castro
 Keefe Cato
 Ike Caveney
 César Cedeño
 Juan Cerros
 Elio Chacón
 Elton Chamberlain
 Jim Chamblee
 Darrel Chaney
 Aroldis Chapman
 Calvin Chapman
 Harry Chapman
 Bill Chappelle
 Chappy Charles
 Norm Charlton
 Hal Chase
 Charlie Chech
 Bruce Chen
 Shin-Soo Choo
 Harry Chozen
 Cuckoo Christensen
 Steve Christmas
 Bubba Church
 Tony Cingrani
 Bob Clark
 Brady Clark
 Jermaine Clark
 Lefty Clarke
 Tommy Clarke
 Brandon Claussen
 Dain Clay
 Royce Clayton
 Ty Cline
 Billy Clingman
 Jim Clinton
 Tony Cloninger
 Andy Coakley
 Jim Coates
 Buck Coats
 Goat Cochran
 Todd Coffey
 Jimmie Coker
 Gordy Coleman
 Percy Coleman
 Vince Coleman
 Chuck Coles
 Darnell Coles
 Dave Collins
 Jackie Collum
 Geoff Combe
Charlie Comiskey
 Adam Comorosky
 Jack Compton
 Dave Concepción
 Jeff Conine
 Snipe Conley
 Theodore Conover
 Carlos Contreras
 Cliff Cook
 Dusty Cooke
 Steve Cooke
 Walker Cooper
 Claude Corbitt
 Daniel Corcino
 Mickey Corcoran
 Tommy Corcoran
 Francisco Cordero
 Pop Corkhill
 Rhéal Cormier
 Pat Corrales
 Vic Correll
 Mike Costanzo
 Tim Costo
 Johnny Couch
 Bob Coulson
 Fritz Coumbe
 John Courtright
 Jon Coutlangus
 Harry Coveleski
 Zack Cozart
 Estel Crabtree
 Harry Craft
 Roger Craig
 Bill Cramer
 Ed Crane
 Sam Crane
 Pat Crawford
Sam Crawford
 Pete Cregan
 Walker Cress
 Tony Criscola
 Hughie Critz
 D. T. Cromer
 Ned Crompton
 Jack Cronin
 Ed Crosby
 Lem Cross
 Jack Crouch
 George Crowe
 Jim Crowell
 Terry Crowley
 Enrique Cruz
 Héctor Cruz
 Jacob Cruz
 Tony Cuccinello
 Mike Cuellar
 Johnny Cueto
 Manuel Cueto
 Nick Cullop
 George Culver
 Clarence Currie
 Ervin Curtis
Kiki Cuyler

D

 Gene Dale
 Tom Daley
 Tom Daly
 Bill Dammann
 Bert Daniels
 Kal Daniels
 George Darby
 Pat Darcy
 Frank Dasso
 Dan Daub
 Jake Daubert
 Jack Daugherty
 Dave Davenport
 Ted Davidson
 Dixie Davis
 Eric Davis
 Kiddo Davis
 Lance Davis
 Lefty Davis
 Peaches Davis
 Spud Davis
 Wiley Davis
 Travis Dawkins
 Pea Ridge Day
 Tommy de la Cruz
 Mike de la Hoz
 Ren Deagle
 Snake Deal
 Charlie DeArmond
 Arturo DeFreites
 Pat Deisel
 Mike Dejan
 Jim Delahanty
 Rich DeLucia
 Enerio del Rosario
 Ryan Dempster
 Ryan Dennick
 John Denny
 Chris Denorfia
 Tony DePhillips
 Claud Derrick
 Paul Derringer
 Elmer Dessens
 Josh Devore
 Bo Díaz
 Jumbo Díaz
 Rob Dibble
 Pedro Dibut
 Chris Dickerson
 Jim Dickson
 Vince DiMaggio
 Leo Dixon
 Bill Doak
 John Dobbs
 Jess Dobernic
 John Dodge
 Cozy Dolan (1903-05)
 Cozy Dolan (1909)
 John Dolan
 Ed Donalds
 Mike Donlin
 Pete Donohue
 Red Dooin
 Bill Doran
 Gus Dorner
 Brian Dorsett
 Jack Doscher
 Dutch Dotterer
 Phil Douglas
 Astyanax Douglass
 Taylor Douthit
 Tom Downey
 Tom Dowse
 Jim Doyle
 Slow Joe Doyle
 Moe Drabowsky
 Chuck Dressen
 Karl Drews
 Dan Driessen
 Walt Dropo
 Carl Druhot
 Jean Dubuc
 Jim Duffalo
 Charlie Duffee
 Frank Duffy
 Zach Duke
 Phil Dumatrait
 Dan Dumoulin
 Mariano Duncan
 Pat Duncan
 Adam Dunn
 Blaine Durbin
 Ryne Duren
 Leon Durham
 Bobby Durnbaugh
 Leo Durocher
 Jesse Duryea
 Adam Duvall
 Joe Dwyer
 Frank Dwyer
 Jim Dyck

E

 Billy Earle
 Rawly Eastwick
 Al Eckert
 Joe Edelen
 Jim Edmonds
 Bruce Edwards
 Hank Edwards
 Jim Joe Edwards
 Johnny Edwards
 Sherman Edwards
 Dick Egan
 Red Ehret
 Rube Ehrhardt
 Joey Eischen
 Jake Eisenhart
 Kid Elberfeld
 Roy Ellam
 Hod Eller
 Claude Elliott
 Sammy Ellis
 Jason Ellison
 Jake Elmore
 Frank Emmer
 Edwin Encarnación
 Juan Encarnación
 Joe Engel
 Charlie English
 Del Ennis
 Eddie Erautt
 Hank Erickson
 Tex Erwin
 Nick Esasky
 Nino Escalera
 Jimmy Esmond
 Cecil Espy
 Bill Essick
 Shawn Estes
 Seth Etherton
 Bob Ewing
Buck Ewing

F

 Pete Fahrer
 Frank Fanovich
 Buck Fausett
 Frank Fennelly
 Bob Ferguson
 Jared Fernández
 Osvaldo Fernández
 Tony Fernández
 Al Ferrara
 Neil Fiala
 Steve Filipowicz
 Hank Fischer
 Bob Fisher
 Carlos Fisher
 Chauncey Fisher
 Jack Fisher
 Maurice Fisher
 Ray Fisher
 Paul Fittery
 Ray Fitzgerald
 Wally Flager
 Sam Fletcher
 Curt Flood
 Jake Flowers
 Carney Flynn
 Doug Flynn
 Josh Fogg
 Lee Fohl
 Hank Foiles
 Tom Foley
 Dee Fondy
 Lew Fonseca
 Hod Ford
 Brook Fordyce
 Brownie Foreman
 Frank Foreman
 Tim Fortugno
 George Foster
 Steve Foster
 Henry Fournier
 Art Fowler
 Boob Fowler
 Bill Fox
 Howie Fox
 Jeff Francis
 Juan Francisco
 John Franco
 Terry Francona
 Mike Frank
 Ryan Franklin
 Chick Fraser
 Joe Frazier
 Todd Frazier
 Roger Freed
 Ryan Freel
 Hersh Freeman
 Gene Freese
 Tony Freitas
 Benny Frey
 Lonny Frey
 Jim Fridley
 John Frill
 Emil Frisk
 Art Fromme
 Woodie Fryman
 Chick Fulmer

G

 Phil Gagliano
 Joe Gaines
 Augie Galan
 Milt Galatzer
 Rich Gale
 Lee Gamble
 Ron Gant
 John Ganzel
 Guillermo Garcia
 Leo García
 Greg Garrett
 Harry Gaspar
 Hank Gastright
 Bob Geary
 Paul Gehrman
 Phil Geier
 Charlie Gelbert
 Frank Genins
 Lefty George
 Justin Germano
 Ed Gerner
 Dick Gernert
 César Gerónimo
 Gus Getz
 Joe Gibbon
 Steve Gibralter
 Jerry Gil
 Buddy Gilbert
 Wally Gilbert
 Haddie Gill
 John Gillespie
 Keith Glauber
 Jim Gleeson
 Martin Glendon
 Norm Glockson
 Jot Goar
 Lonnie Goldstein
 Jonny Gomes
 Jesse Gonder
 Álex González
 Mike González
 Raúl González
 Tony González
 Johnny Gooch
 Ival Goodman
 Curtis Goodwin
 Marv Goodwin
 Glen Gorbous
 Keith Gordon
 Mike Gosling
 Mike Grace
 Tiny Graham
 Alex Grammas
 Wayne Granger
 Eddie Grant
 George Grantham
 Danny Graves
 Bill Gray
 Jeff Gray
 Gary Green
 Gene Green
 Rick Greene
 Willie Greene
 Jim Greengrass
 Tommy Gregg
 Frank Gregory
 Didi Gregorius
 Ken Griffey, Sr.
 Ken Griffey Jr.
 Mike Griffin
 Pat Griffin
 Clark Griffith
 Tommy Griffith
 Bob Grim
 Ross Grimsley
 Lee Grissom
 Heinie Groh
 Don Gross
 Kip Gross
 Matt Grott
 Eddie Guardado
 Marv Gudat
 Wilton Guerrero
 Whitey Guese
 José Guillén
 Lefty Guise
 Brad Gulden
 Don Gullett
 Bill Gullickson
 Harry Gumbert
 Juan Guzmán

H

 Bert Haas
 Emil Haberer
 Warren Hacker
 Harvey Haddix
 Bud Hafey
Chick Hafey
 Leo Hafford
 Joe Hague
 Noodles Hahn
Jesse Haines
 Jerry Hairston Jr.
 Charley Hall
 Josh Hall
 Tom Hall
 Bill Hallahan
 Jocko Halligan
 Billy Hamilton
 Joey Hamilton
 Josh Hamilton
 Chris Hammond
 Jeffrey Hammonds
 Josh Hancock
 Lee Handley
 Ryan Hanigan
 Jack Hannahan
 Erik Hanson
 Aaron Harang
 Bubbles Hargrave
 Dick Harley
 Chuck Harmon
 Pete Harnisch
 George Harper
 Jack Harper
 Tommy Harper
 Andy Harrington
 Jerry Harrington
 Bill Harris
 Brendan Harris
 Greg Harris
 Lenny Harris
 Willie Harris
 Earl Harrist
 Frank Harter
 Topsy Hartsel
 Billy Hatcher
 Fred Hatfield
 Scott Hatteberg
 Grady Hatton
 Phil Haugstad
 Pink Hawley
 Gene Hayden
 Ben Hayes
 Jimmy Haynes
 Bob Hazle
 Mickey Heath
 Cliff Heathcote
 John Heileman
Harry Heilmann
 Chris Heisey
 Crese Heismann
 Tommy Helms
 George Hemming
 Rollie Hemsley
 Joe Henderson
 Ken Henderson
 Harvey Hendrick
 Bobby Henrich
 Bill Henry
 Dwayne Henry
 George Henry
 Ernie Herbert
 Félix Heredia
 Babe Herman
 Jeremy Hermida
 César Hernández
 Ramón Hernández
 Xavier Hernandez
 Daniel Herrera
 Leroy Herrmann
 Willard Hershberger
 Buck Herzog
 Johnny Hetki
 Ed Heusser
 Andy High
 Whitey Hilcher
 Bill Hill
 Milt Hill
 Frank Hiller
 Dave Hillman
 Bill Hinchman
 Rich Hinton
 Roy Hitt
 Don Hoak
 Bill Hobbs
 Dick Hoblitzel
 Ed Hock
 Joe Hoerner
 Guy Hoffman
 Kenny Hogan
 Marty Hogan
 George Hogreiver
 Aaron Holbert
 Ken Holcombe
 Bill Holden
 Walter Holke
 Mul Holland
 Todd Hollandsworth
 Bug Holliday
 Al Hollingsworth
 David Holmberg
 Jay Hook
 Buck Hooker
 Bob Hooper
 Buster Hoover
 J. J. Hoover
 Norris Hopper
 Hanson Horsey
 Jeremy Horst
 Frank House
 Paul Householder
 Lefty Houtz
 Thomas Howard
 Dixie Howell (C)
 Dixie Howell (P)
 Jay Howell
 Dummy Hoy
 John Hudek
 Jimmy Hudgens
 Luke Hudson
 Miller Huggins
 Keith Hughes
 Tommy Hughes
 Emil Huhn
 Rudy Hulswitt
 Tom Hume
 Tim Hummel
 Bert Humphries
 Ken Hunt
 Brian Hunter (1B)
 Brian Hunter (OF)
 Eddie Hunter
 Clint Hurdle
 Jerry Hurley
 Johnny Hutchings
 Mark Hutton

I

 Raisel Iglesias
 Jonathan India
 Bob Ingersoll
 Bert Inks
 Bill Irwin
 Charlie Irwin
 César Izturis

J

 Ray Jablonski
 Al Jackson
 Damian Jackson
 Danny Jackson
 Mike Jackson
 Art Jacobs
 Larry Jacobus
 Charlie James
 Paul Janish
 Larry Jansen
 Kevin Jarvis
 Julián Javier
 Joey Jay
 Hal Jeffcoat
 Reggie Jefferson
 Stan Jefferson
 Robin Jennings
 D'Angelo Jiménez
 Ollie Johns
 Todd Johnson
 Alex Johnson
 Bob Johnson
 Brian Johnson
 Chief Johnson
 Darrell Johnson
 Deron Johnson
 Hank Johnson
 Jason Johnson
 Ken Johnson
 Si Johnson
 Syl Johnson
 Doc Johnston
 Bumpus Jones
 Charley Jones
 Chris Jones
 Jeff Jones
 Mack Jones
 Sherman Jones
 Todd Jones
 Tracy Jones
 Willie Jones
 Eddie Joost
 Buck Jordan
 Niles Jordan
 Ricardo Jordan
 Pinky Jorgensen
 Ryan Jorgensen
 Frank Jude
 Howie Judson
 Joe Just
 Herb Juul

K

 Mike Kahoe
 Jeff Kaiser
 Alex Kampouris
 John Kane
 Heinie Kappel
 Ed Karger
 Eddie Kasko
 Bob Katz
 Eddie Kazak
 Austin Kearns
 Cactus Keck
 Bobby Keefe
 Jim Keenan
 Randy Keisler
 Frankie Kelleher
Joe Kelley
 Alex Kellner
 Bill Kellogg
 Win Kellum
 Bob Kelly
George Kelly
 Kenny Kelly
 Mike Kelly
 Roberto Kelly
 Bill Kelso
 Rudy Kemmler
 Dutch Kemner
 Bill Kennedy
 Junior Kennedy
 Vern Kennedy
 Marty Keough
 Jeff Keppinger
 Jim Kern
 Dan Kerwin
 Keith Kessinger
 Brooks Kieschnick
 Red Killefer
 Sun-Woo Kim
 Wally Kimmick
 Clyde King
 Hal King
 Silver King
 Ed Kippert
 Clay Kirby
 Bobby Klaus
 Ollie Klee
 Ted Kleinhans
 Johnny Kling
 Scott Klingenbeck
 Johnny Klippstein
 Ted Kluszewski
 Frank Knauss
 Elmer Knetzer
 Alan Knicely
 Joe Knight
 Ray Knight
 Pete Knisely
 Brian Koelling
 Mark Koenig
 Elmer Koestner
 Ray Kolp
 Paul Konerko
 Mike Konnick
 Jim Konstanty
 Larry Kopf
 Andy Kosco
 Mike Kosman
 Ernie Koy
 Charlie Krause
 Wayne Krenchicki
 Chuck Kress
 Rick Krivda
 Marc Kroon
 Ernie Krueger
 Art Kruger
 Bill Kuehne
 Andy Kyle

L

 Mike LaCoss
 Al Lakeman
 Ray Lamanno
 Clayton Lambert
 Pete Lamer
 Rafael Landestoy
 Hobie Landrith
 Bill Landrum
 Jerry Lane
 Don Lang
 Paul LaPalme
 Andy Larkin
 Barry Larkin
 Stephen Larkin
 Harry LaRoss
 Brandon Larson
 Jason LaRue
 Arlie Latham
 Mat Latos
 Garland Lawing
 Tom Lawless
 Brooks Lawrence
 Tim Layana
 Tommy Leach
 Mike Leake
 King Lear
 Frank Leary
 Tim Leary
 Sam LeCure
 Bob Lee
 Cliff Lee
 Terry Lee
 Justin Lehr
 Charlie Leibrandt
 George Lerchen
 Brad Lesley
 Darren Lewis
 Fred Lewis (2000s OF)
 Fred Lewis (1880s OF)
 Mark Lewis
 Richie Lewis
 Al Libke
 Cory Lidle
 Derek Lilliquist
 Mike Lincoln
 Jim Lindsey
 Johnny Lipon
 Hod Lisenbee
 Danny Litwhiler
 Buddy Lively
 Wes Livengood
 Bobby Livingston
 Paddy Livingston
 Hans Lobert
 Bobby Locke
 Gene Locklear
 Whitey Lockman
 Bob Logan
 Howard Lohr
 Bill Lohrman
 Kyle Lohse
Ernie Lombardi
 Felipe López
 Luis López
 Pedro López
 Baldy Louden
 George Lowe
 Turk Lown
 Peanuts Lowrey
 Red Lucas
 Ryan Ludwick
 Larry Luebbers
 Henry Luff
 Eddie Lukon
 Mike Lum
 Dolf Luque
 Red Lutz
 Jerry Lynch
 Curt Lyons

M

 Bob Mabe
 Raymond Manahan
 Danny MacFayden
 Anderson Machado
 Scott MacRae
 Jimmy Macullar
 Scotti Madison
 Lee Magee
 Sherry Magee
 George Magoon
 Rick Mahler
 Dan Mahoney
 Danny Mahoney
 Gary Majewski
 Bob Malloy
 Billy Maloney
 Jim Maloney
 Matt Maloney
 Clyde Manion
 Les Mann
 Tom Mansell
 Robert Manuel
 Josías Manzanillo
 Cliff Markle
Rube Marquard
 Bob Marquis
 Lefty Marr
 Armando Marsans
 Bill Marshall
 Max Marshall
 Sean Marshall
 Willard Marshall
 Barney Martin
 Billy Martin
 Carmelo Martínez
 Dave Martinez
 Pedro A. Martínez
 Clyde Mashore
 Leech Maskrey
 Del Mason
 Nick Masset
 Bill Massey
 Rubén Mateo
Christy Mathewson
 Mike Matthews
 Bobby Mattick
 Jakie May
 Lee May
 Carl Mays
 Joe Mays
 Marcus McBeth
 Algie McBride
 Swat McCabe
 William McCaffrey
 Bill McCarthy
 Jack McCarthy
 Tom McCarthy
 Lloyd McClendon
 Harry McCluskey
 Billy McCool
 Frank McCormick
 Harry McCormick
 Mike McCormick
 Barney McCosky
 Quinton McCracken
 Harry McCurdy
 Darnell McDonald
 Tex McDonald
 Chuck McElroy
 Will McEnaney
 Barney McFadden
 Herm McFarland
 Andy McGaffigan
 Willie McGill
 Bill McGilvray
 Dan McGinn
 Jumbo McGinnis
 Jim McGlothlin
 Howard McGraner
 Terry McGriff
 McGuire
 Harry McIntire
Bill McKechnie
 Limb McKenry
 Larry McKeon
 Kid McLaughlin
 Larry McLean
 Cal McLish
 Joe McManus
 Roy McMillan
 Tommy McMillan
 Hugh McMullen
Bid McPhee
 Herb McQuaid
 Mike McQueen
 George McQuillan
 George McQuinn
 Hal McRae
 Doug McWeeny
 Rufus Meadows
 George Meakim
 Ray Medeiros
 Roy Meeker
 Sammy Meeks
 Bob Meinke
 Karl Meister
 Sam Mejías
 Dutch Mele
 Sam Mele
 Tony Menéndez
 Denis Menke
 Héctor Mercado
 Kent Mercker
 Lloyd Merriman
 Bill Merritt
 Jim Merritt
 Steve Mesner
 Devin Mesoraco
 Bob Meusel
 Russ Meyer
 Chris Michalak
 Ezra Midkiff
 Eddie Miksis
 Bob Miller
 Corky Miller
 Doc Miller
 Dusty Miller
 Eddie Miller
 George Miller
 Ward Miller
 Randy Milligan
 Eddie Milner
 Eric Milton
 Cotton Minahan
 Rudy Minarcin
 Gino Minutelli
 Clarence Mitchell
 Keith Mitchell
 Kevin Mitchell
 Mike Mitchell
 Roy Mitchell
 Mike Modak
 Brian Moehler
 Chad Moeller
 Fritz Mollwitz
 Jeff Montgomery
 Dee Moore
 Gene Moore (OF)
 Gene Moore (P)
 Johnny Moore
 Marcus Moore
 Whitey Moore
 Jake Mooty
 Herbie Moran
 Danny Morejón
 Cy Morgan
 Joe Morgan
 Mike Morgan
 Bill Moriarty
 Hal Morris
 Jack Morrissey
 JoJo Morrissey
 Earl Moseley
 Arnie Moser
 Paul Moskau
 Howie Moss
 Chad Mottola
 Frank Motz
 Bill Mountjoy
 Mike Mowrey
 Ray Mueller
 Tony Mullane
 Connie Murphy
 Dick Murphy
 Joe Murphy
 Morgan Murphy
 Rob Murphy
 Dale Murray
 Billy Myers
 Hy Myers
 Randy Myers
 Aaron Myette

N

 Pete Naktenis
 Buddy Napier
 Dioner Navarro
 Denny Neagle
 Charlie Neal
 Greasy Neale
 Kristopher Negron
 Art Nehf
 Emmett Nelson
 Red Nelson
 Roger Nelson
 Ernie Nevel
 Don Newcombe
 Doc Newton
 Chet Nichols Jr.
 Chris Nichting
 Hugh Nicol
 Al Niehaus
 Bert Niehoff
 Jack Niemes
 Melvin Nieves
 Johnny Niggeling
 C. J. Nitkowski
 Laynce Nix
 Paul Noce
 Gary Nolan
 Joe Nolan
 John Noriega
 Fred Norman
 Hub Northen
 Ron Northey
 Phil Norton
 Don Nottebart
 Howie Nunn
 Jon Nunnally
 Joe Nuxhall

O

 Mike O'Berry
 Pete O'Brien
 Jack O'Connor
 Bob O'Farrell
 Mike O'Neill
 Paul O'Neill
 Peaches O'Neill
 Tip O'Neill
 Jim O'Toole
 Marty O'Toole
 Rebel Oakes
 Alex Ochoa
 Fred Odwell
 Ron Oester
 Jack Ogden
 John Oldham
 Joe Oliver
 Ray Olmedo
 Ivy Olson
 Logan Ondrusek
 Ramón Ortiz
 Pat Osburn
 Claude Osteen
 Darrell Osteen
 Jimmy Outlaw
 Orval Overall
 Bob Owchinko
 Eric Owens
 Jim Owens
 Micah Owings

P

 Pat Pacillo
 Gene Packard
 Juan Padilla
 Stan Palys
 Milt Pappas
 Kelly Paris
 Dave Parker
 Doc Parker
 Manny Parra
 Steve Parris
 Tom Parrott
 Camilo Pascual
 Dode Paskert
 Frank Pastore
 Clare Patterson
 Corey Patterson
 Xavier Paul
 Si Pauxtis
 Don Pavletich
 Bunny Pearce
 Jim Pearce
 Monte Pearson
 George Pechiney
 Steve Pegues
 Heinie Peitz
 Eddie Pellagrini
 Brayan Peña
 José Peña
 Orlando Peña
 Wily Mo Peña
 Jim Pendleton
 Terry Pendleton
 Brad Pennington
 Jimmy Peoples
 Eduardo Pérez
 Miguel Pérez
 Tony Pérez
 Harry Perkowski
 Pat Perry
 Scott Perry
 Roberto Petagine
 Kent Peterson
 Ted Petoskey
 Charlie Petty
 Adam Pettyjohn
 Bill Pfann
 Art Phelan
 Ed Phelps
 Andy Phillips
 Bill Phillips
 Brandon Phillips
 Damon Phillips
 Denis Phipps
 Val Picinich
 Eddie Pick
 Calvin Pickering
 Mario Picone
 Chris Piersoll
 Tony Piet
 Herman Pillette
 Luis Pineda
 Babe Pinelli
 Vada Pinson
 Wally Pipp
 Pinky Pittenger
 Bill Plummer
 Bud Podbielan
 Hugh Poland
 Ken Polivka
 Harlin Pool
 Ed Poole
 Mark Portugal
 Wally Post
 Abner Powell
 Bill Powell
 Ross Powell
 Ted Power
 John Powers
 Phil Powers
 Johnny Pramesa
 Joe Price
 Eddie Priest
 Doc Prothro
 Bill Prough
 Tim Pugh
 Charlie Puleo
 Pid Purdy
 Bob Purkey
 Harlan Pyle

Q

 Mel Queen Jr.
 Jack Quinn
 Joe Quinn
 Luis Quiñones

R

 Charlie Rabe
 Marv Rackley
Charles Radbourn
 Ken Raffensberger
 Pat Ragan
 Rip Ragan
 Elizardo Ramírez
 Ramón Ramírez
 Chucho Ramos
 Pedro Ramos
 Willie Ramsdell
 Joe Randa
 Scott Randall
 Bill Rariden
 Dennis Rasmussen
 Morrie Rath
 Johnny Rawlings
 Jeff Reardon
 Jeremiah Reardon
 Todd Redmond
 Gary Redus
 Jeff Reed
 Rick Reed
 Icicle Reeder
 Pokey Reese
 Mike Regan
 Wally Rehg
 John Reilly
 Chad Reineke
 Brian Reith
 Chris Reitsma
 Mike Remlinger
 Édgar Rentería
 Merv Rettenmund
 George Rettger
 Jerry Reuss
 Dennys Reyes
 Greg Reynolds
 Billy Rhines
 Arthur Rhodes
 Charlie Rhodes
 Dennis Ribant
 Harry Rice
 Len Rice
 Danny Richar
 Duane Richards
 Jeff Richardson
 Nolen Richardson
 Beryl Richmond
 Lee Richmond
 Marv Rickert
 Harry Riconda
 Elmer Riddle
 Johnny Riddle
 Steve Ridzik
 John Riedling
 Lew Riggs
 José Rijo
 Jimmy Ring
 Jimmy Ripple
 Claude Ritchey
 Jay Ritchie
 Rubén Rivera
Eppa Rixey
 Johnny Rizzo
 Tony Robello
 Bip Roberts
 Dick Robertson
 Derrick Robinson
 Floyd Robinson
 Frank Robinson
 Kerry Robinson
 Rabbit Robinson
 Ron Robinson
 Bill Rodgers
 Félix Rodríguez
 Frank Rodriguez
 Henry Rodríguez
 Rosario Rodríguez
 Yorman Rodríguez
 Josh Roenicke
 Ron Roenicke
 Mike Roesler
 Wally Roettger
 Clint Rogge
 Cookie Rojas
 Scott Rolen
 Jason Romano
 Rolando Roomes
 John Roper
 Adam Rosales
 Pete Rose
 Pete Rose Jr.
 Cliff Ross
 Cody Ross
 Dave Ross
 Joe Rossi
 Frank Roth
Edd Roush
 Jack Rowan
 Wade Rowdon
 Sonny Ruberto
 Don Rudolph
 Dutch Ruether
 Johnny Ruffin
 Chico Ruiz
 Tom Runnells
Amos Rusie
 Scott Ruskin
 Jeff Russell
 B. J. Ryan
 Connie Ryan

S

 Kirk Saarloos
 Chris Sabo
 Donnie Sadler
 Roger Salkeld
 Slim Sallee
 Brad Salmon
 Juan Samuel
 Jesús Sánchez
 Raúl Sánchez
 Gus Sandberg
 Deion Sanders
 Reggie Sanders
 Roy Sanders
 Mo Sanford
 Benito Santiago
 Ramón Santiago
 Rafael Santo Domingo
 Víctor Santos
 Dave Sappelt
 Dane Sardinha
 Manny Sarmiento
 Hank Sauer
 Ted Savage
 Ralph Savidge
 Moe Savransky
 Pat Scantlebury
 Les Scarsella
 Jimmie Schaffer
 Bob Scheffing
 Richie Scheinblum
 Bill Scherrer
 Admiral Schlei
 Bob Schmidt
 Willard Schmidt
 Johnny Schmitz
 Pete Schneider
 Karl Schnell
 Scott Schoeneweis
 Gene Schott
 Pete Schourek
 Barney Schreiber
 Hank Schreiber
 Pop Schriver
 Wes Schulmerich
 Art Schult
 Howie Schultz
 Joe Schultz
 Mike Schultz
 Al Schulz
 Skip Schumaker
 Dick Scott
 Donnie Scott
 Ed Scott
 Everett Scott
 Jack Scott
 Scott Scudder
Tom Seaver
 Bob Sebra
 Jimmy Sebring
 Frank Secory
 Charlie See
 Kip Selbach
 Bill Selby
 Andy Seminick
 Billy Serad
 Dan Serafini
 Scott Service
 Hank Severeid
 Chris Sexton
 Socks Seybold
 Cy Seymour
 Brian Shackelford
 Gus Shallix
 Art Shamsky
 Wally Shaner
 Joe Shaute
 Jeff Shaw
 Mike Shea
 Dave Shean
 Tom Shearn
 Jimmy Sheckard
 Tom Sheehan
 Jimmy Shevlin
 Bob Shirley
 Ivey Shiver
 Milt Shoffner
 Eddie Shokes
 Bill Short
 Chick Shorten
 Clyde Shoun
 Ed Sicking
 Johnny Siegle
 Candy Sierra
 Rubén Sierra
 Frank Sigafoos
 José Silva
 Al Silvera
Al Simmons
 Alfredo Simón
 Allan Simpson
 Dick Simpson
 Wayne Simpson
 Bert Sincock
 Dick Sipek
 Dave Sisler
 Dick Sisler
 Dave Skaugstad
 Bob Skinner
 Gordon Slade
 Walt Slagle
 Mike Slattery
 John Smiley
 Bob Smith
 Chick Smith
 Elmer Smith (1886–1900)
 Elmer Smith (1925)
 Frank Smith (1911–1912)
 Frank Smith (1950–1956)
 Fred Smith
 George Smith
 Germany Smith
 Hal Smith
 Harry Smith
 Jimmy Smith
 Jordan Smith
 Jud Smith
 Lee Smith
 Mike Smith
 Milt Smith
 Paul Smith
 Pete Smith
 Willie Smith
 Stephen Smitherman
 Homer Smoot
 Van Snider
 Pop Snyder
 Joe Sommer
 Mario Soto
 Bob Spade
 Daryl Spencer
 Harry Spies
 Harry Spilman
 Jerry Spradlin
 Ed Sprague
 Brad Springer
 Russ Springer
 Randy St. Claire
 Larry Stahl
 Jerry Staley
 Virgil Stallcup
 Oscar Stanage
 Jason Standridge
 Mike Stanton
 Ray Starr
 Dan Stearns
 Justin Stein
 Harry Steinfeldt
 Dernell Stenson
 Jake Stenzel
 Ben Stephens
 Clarence Stephens
 Jimmy Stewart
 Mark Stewart
 Kurt Stillwell
 Archie Stimmel
 Lee Stine
 Kelly Stinnett
 Ricky Stone
 Rocky Stone
 Allyn Stout
 Gabby Street
 Ed Strelecki
 Joe Stripp
 Drew Stubbs
 John Stuper
 Lena Styles
 Chris Stynes
 Eugenio Suarez
 George Suggs
 Clyde Sukeforth
 Billy Sullivan Jr.
 Mike Sullivan
 Scott Sullivan
 Tom Sullivan
 Champ Summers
 Glenn Sutko
 Jack Sutthoff
 Drew Sutton
 Evar Swanson
 Monty Swartz
 Mark Sweeney
 Greg Swindell
 Len Swormstedt
 Lou Sylvester
 Joe Szekely

T

 Jeff Tabaka
 Jesse Tannehill
 Ted Tappe
 Tony Tarasco
 Craig Tatum
 Tommy Tatum
 Eddie Taubensee
 Willy Taveras
 Ben Taylor
 Jack Taylor
 Joe Taylor
 Reggie Taylor
 Sammy Taylor
 George Tebeau
 Kent Tekulve
 Johnny Temple
 Scott Terry
 Jack Theis
 Tommy Thevenow
 Henry Thielman
 Frank Thomas
 Daryl Thompson
 Junior Thompson
 Tug Thompson
 Jim Thorpe
 Bob Thurman
 Jay Tibbs
 Eddie Tiemeyer
 Bill Tierney
 Ozzie Timmons
Joe Tinker
 Eric Tipton
 Bobby Tolan
 Freddie Toliver
 Brett Tomko
 Dave Tomlin
 Chuck Tompkins
 Fred Toney
 Ángel Torres
 Bill Tozer
 Bill Traffley
 Jeff Treadway
 Alex Treviño
 Manny Trillo
 John Tsitouris
 Greg Tubbs
 Michael Tucker
 Jim Turner
 Twink Twining
 George Twombly

U

 Ted Uhlaender
 Maury Uhler
 George Ulrich
 Al Unser
 Bob Usher

V

 Mike Vail
 Chris Valaika
 Wilson Valdez
 Eric Valent
 Javier Valentín
 Corky Valentine
 Joe Valentine
 Dave Van Gorder
 Todd Van Poppel
Dazzy Vance
 Johnny Vander Meer
 John Vander Wal
 Gary Varsho
 Farmer Vaughn
 Greg Vaughn
 Max Venable
 Lee Viau
 Rube Vickers
 Pedro Villarreal
 Ron Villone
 Frank Viola
 Pedro Viola
 Clyde Vollmer
 Edinson Vólquez
 Jake Volz
 Fritz Von Kolnitz
 Joey Votto
 Rip Vowinkel
 John Vukovich

W

 Joe Wagner
 Ryan Wagner
 Kermit Wahl
 Curt Walker
 Duane Walker
 Gee Walker
 Harry Walker
 Hub Walker
 Mysterious Walker
 Terry Walker
 Todd Walker
 Tom Walker
 Lee Walls
 Bucky Walters
 Ken Walters
 Jerome Walton
Lloyd Waner
 Pee-Wee Wanninger
 Jay Ward
 Piggy Ward
 Ray Washburn
 Pat Watkins
 Brandon Watson
 Mark Watson
 Mother Watson
 David Weathers
 Jim Weaver
 Ben Weber
 Herm Wehmeier
 Podge Weihe
 Jake Weimer
 Phil Weintraub
 Curt Welch
 David Wells
 Kip Wells
 Chris Welsh
 Billy Werber
 Don Werner
 Buck West
 Dick West
 Max West
 Wally Westlake
 Gus Weyhing
 John Weyhing
 George Wheeler
 Harry Wheeler
 Pete Whisenant
 Gabe White
 Jack White
 Jo-Jo White
 Rick White
 Will White
 Fred Whitfield
 Bill Whitrock
 Kevin Wickander
 Bob Wicker
 Al Wickland
 Wild Bill Widner
 Ted Wieand
 Jimmy Wiggs
 Bill Wight
 Milt Wilcox
 Dallas Williams
 Dave Williams
 Denny Williams
 Dewey Williams
 Frank Williams
 Ken Williams
 Todd Williams
 Woody Williams
 Scott Williamson
 Carl Willis
 Dontrelle Willis
 Ted Wills
 Dan Wilson
 Jimmie Wilson
 Nigel Wilson
 Paul Wilson
 Scott Winchester
 Ivey Wingo
 Jesse Winker
 Herm Winningham
 DeWayne Wise
 Whitey Wistert
 Mark Wohlers
 Ray Wolf
 Harry Wolter
 Tony Womack
 Bob Wood
 George Wood
 Harry Wood
 Jake Wood
 Travis Wood
 Sam Woodruff
 Woody Woodward
 Ralph Works
 Al Worthington
 Craig Worthington
 Jimmy Woulfe
 Rick Wrona
 Johnny Wyrostek
 Biff Wysong

X
None

Y

 Esteban Yan
 Earl Yingling
 Babe Young
 Del Young
 Dmitri Young
 Pep Young
 Joel Youngblood

Z

Pat Zachry
Paul Zahniser
Dom Zanni
Benny Zientara
Don Zimmer
Jerry Zimmerman
Billy Zitzmann
George Zuverink

External links
BR batting statistics
BR pitching statistics
 

Roster
Major League Baseball all-time rosters